Rolf Westman (21 June 1927 - 12 January 2017) was a Finnish antiquarian and professor of Greek and Latin at the Åbo Akademi University from 1958 to  1993. He visited the University of Cambridge to give lectures.

References 

1927 births
2017 deaths
Finnish people of Swedish descent
Academic staff of Åbo Akademi University